Avant-lès-Marcilly (literally Avant near Marcilly) is a commune in the Aube department in the Grand Est region of north-central France.

The inhabitants of the commune are known as Avants or Avantes.

Geography
Avant-lès-Marcilly is located some 40 km north-west of Troyes and 32 km south-east of Provins. Access to the commune is by road D54 from Nogent-sur-Seine in the north-west which passes through the centre of the commune and the village and continues south-east to Marcilly-le-Hayer. The D52 come from Soligny-les-Étangs in the west and passes through the village continuing to Ferreux-Quincey in the north-east. The D23 branches from the D54 in the south of the commune and goes to Saint-Lupien in the south-east. Apart from the village there are the hamlets of Les Ormeaux, Le Mesnil, and Tremblay. There are some forests in the east of the commune but the rest is farmland.

The Ru du Gué de l'Éspine rises near the village and flows west to join the Orvin at Soligny-les-Etangs.

Neighbouring communes and villages

History
The origins of the commune can be dated back to about the time of construction of the church in the 12th and 13th centuries. There are also gravestones with the oldest dating to the 13th century. This fief belonged to Angenoust at the end of the 15th and the beginning of the 16th century and was under Nogent-sur-Seine.

Many older historic remains are still visible in the area such as menhirs (the Marguerite Stone and the Pierre-au-Coq) and dolmens (next to Les Ormeaux).

Administration

List of Successive Mayors

Demography
In 2017 the commune had 508 inhabitants.

Culture and heritage

Civil heritage
The commune has one site that is registered as an historical monument:
A Menhir called the Pierre-au-Coq (Neolithic)

Other points of interest
The Marguerite Stone
The Grooves of Côte des Ormeaux
The Commonwealth War Cemetery

Religious heritage
The Church of the Assumption. Avant-lès-Marcilly was a former seat for a priest under the conferment of the Bishop of Troyes. The church is dedicated to the Assumption of the Virgin. It is sandstone and was started on the western side in the 12th century. The bell tower and the west portal are novel. The Romanesque nave was rebuilt in the 18th  century. The eastern part of the church is early gothic.

The Church contains many items that are registered as historical objects:

The Tombstone of François de Palluet (17th century)
The Tombstone of a lady of Angenoust (1567)
The Tombstone of an Abbot (13th century)
The Seat of Héloïse (17th century)
A Statue: Saint Vincent (16th century)
A Secondary Altar and Retable on the south side (19th century)
A Secondary Altar and Retable (19th century)
An Ampule for holy oil (19th century)
2 Statuettes: Angels holding a crown (19th century)
A Paten (19th century)
A Paten (19th century)
A Chalice (19th century)
A Chalice (18th century)
A Chalice (1882)
A Cope (19th century)
A Cope (19th century)
A Cope (19th century)
A Processional Banner (1895)
A Processional Banner: Notre-Dame d'Avant (20th century)
A Statue: Christ on the Cross (17th century)
A Tombstone (1539)
Baptismal fonts (19th century)
A Processional Staff (17th century)
A Processional Staff: Saint Eloi (17th century)
A Processional Staff: Saint Anne and the Virgin (17th century)
An Altar Painting: Saint Bishop (19th century)
An Altar Painting: Pursuit of Saint Hubert (19th century)

Picture Gallery

Notable people linked to the commune
Jean Grosjean, man of letters.

See also
Communes of the Aube department

References

External links
Avant-lès-Marcilly official website 
Avant-lès-Marcilly on the old IGN website 
Ceremonies on 14 July 2013 for Jean-Louis Marcilly, Mayor of the village from 2008 to 2014 (born in 1947 and died on 30 March 2014) 
Avant-lès-Marcilly on Géoportail, National Geographic Institute (IGN) website 
Avant on the 1750 Cassini Map

Communes of Aube